A special election was held in  after the Democratic incumbent, Frank Le Blond Kloeb, resigned when he was appointed as a district court judge on the U.S. District Court for the Northern District of Ohio. Walter H. Albaugh, the winner, was elected to finish Kloeb's term.

The special election resulted in a gain for Republicans, picking up a seat that they had not held since five years prior to the election. The 4th district remained in solidly Republican hands after this election, and has not had a Democratic representative since Le Bond Kloeb's resignation.

The winner of this election, Walter H. Albaugh, was not a candidate for the next election. Robert F. Jones, also a Republican, won the election by 24.5 percentage points, a far greater margin than that of Albaugh's nine-point margin during this special election.

Results

References 

Ohio 1938 04
Ohio 1938 04
1938 04 Special
Ohio 04 Special
United States House of Representatives 04 Special
United States House of Representatives 1938 04